Draka Nunatak (‘Nunatak Draka’ \'nu-na-tak 'dra-ka\) is the lens-shaped rocky ridge extending 4.2 km and 1.9 km wide, with twin heights rising to 831 m (central one) and 889 m (western one) on the southwest coast of Sjögren Inlet on southern Trinity Peninsula in Graham Land, Antarctica.

The feature is named after the settlements of Draka and Drakata in Southeastern and Southwestern Bulgaria respectively.

Location

Maps
 Trinity Peninsula. Scale 1:250000 topographic map No. 5697. Institut für Angewandte Geodäsie and British Antarctic Survey, 1996.
 Antarctic Digital Database (ADD). Scale 1:250000 topographic map of Antarctica. Scientific Committee on Antarctic Research (SCAR). Since 1993, regularly updated.

Notes

References
 Draka Nunatak. SCAR Composite Antarctic Gazetteer.
 Bulgarian Antarctic Gazetteer. Antarctic Place-names Commission. (details in Bulgarian, basic data in English)

External links
 Draka Nunatak. Copernix satellite image

Nunataks of Trinity Peninsula
Bulgaria and the Antarctic